Department of Railway Inspection is a Bangladesh government regulatory agency under the Ministry of Railways responsible for railway safety and rail inspection. The department is responsible for inspecting railway lines and infrastructure in Bangladesh.

History
Department of Railway Inspection was established in 1890 by the British Raj. The department is responsible for the inspection of raillines and infrastructure in Bangladesh. It is also the lead investigation agencies for major train accidents.

In October 2020 Ashim Kumar Talukdar, Railway inspector, visited railway lines in Dhaka and Chittagong to inspect the installation of digital signals.

References

1890 establishments in India
Organisations based in Dhaka
Government agencies of Bangladesh